Varennes-Vauzelles is a commune in the Nièvre department in central France. It is a northwestern suburb of Nevers. Vauzelles station has rail connections to Nevers and Cosne-sur-Loire.

Demographics

See also
 Communes of the Nièvre department

References

Communes of Nièvre